Elephantosaurus is an extinct genus of dicynodont from the Middle Triassic (Ladinian) Bukobay Formation. The bones of the skull roof are also unusually thick. While usually considered a member of the Stahleckeriidae, generally due to its size, it probably falls just outside the group due to its frontal bone contributing substantially to the margin of the eye socket.

See also 
 List of therapsids

References

External links 
 The main groups of non-mammalian synapsids at Mikko's Phylogeny Archive

Dicynodonts
Anisian life
Triassic synapsids
Triassic Russia
Fossils of Russia
Fossil taxa described in 1969
Anomodont genera